Aberdeen is a historic plantation house located several miles north of Disputanta, Prince George County, Virginia. It was built sometime between 1790 and 1810, by Thomas Cocke. In 1790 Thomas inherited a 1,685-acre portion of his father's estate, Bonnacord, which he named "Aberdeen." Thomas's brother, John P. Cocke, inherited the remainder of Bonnacord. Thomas married Sarah Colley, daughter of Nathaniel and Martha Batte Colley of Tar Bay Plantation located about five miles west of Bonnacord.

Architecture 
Aberdeen is an imposing brick temple-form house. The main facade features an imposing pediment finished with horizontal flush sheathing. The walls are laid in Flemish bond with flat arches over the openings. A diminutive portico with Doric order columns is the central feature. It, and the main roof have cornices with block modillions. A lateral hall runs across the entire front of the house, which is reflected in the side elevations that each have a door and two windows on the first floor below three windows on the second floor. Aberdeen is one of a group of houses in Virginia that have this plan and front elevation. They occur over a long period and are scattered randomly across the state. Aberdeen also features important Federal interior woodwork in remarkably in undisturbed condition. The house sits in a picturesque grove of trees in front of woodland and wetlands. Between the fenced yard and the main road are flat farm fields typical of Tidewater Virginia still in cultivation, as they have been for at least three centuries. On these and other fields, Thomas Cocke and his close friend Edmund Ruffin conducted experiments in fertilization that led to Ruffin's publications that revolutionized agriculture.

Aberdeen was listed on the National Register of Historic Places in 2002.

References

Houses on the National Register of Historic Places in Virginia
Plantation houses in Virginia
Houses in Prince George County, Virginia
Houses completed in 1810
National Register of Historic Places in Prince George County, Virginia